Badharwa  (also: Badaharwa)(Nepali:बडहरवा) is a village development committee in Rautahat District in the Narayani Zone of south-eastern Nepal.

Geography 
The village is separated into two parts by the Bagmati River: the east side and the west side. Although the majority of area taken up by the village lies on the western side, the majority of the population live on the eastern side. Although Rautahat District is separated from the Sarlahi District by Bagmati River in most of its parts, the exceptions are Badaharwa, Dharmapuri and Sedhwa village. Consequently, the village faces Sarlahi district in the east, Matsari village in the north, Saruatha and Jhunkhunwa village in the west and Basatpur village in the south.

Demographics 
According to the normal population and housing census of 2011, the total population of this village is 4949. The male population is 2616 and the female population is 2333. The total number of household is 802.

Economy 
The major occupations of people in this village are farming, government services, construction works, and factory works (often working abroad either in Indian cities such as Ludhiana, Mumbai, Delhi, etc., in Arab countries such as the UAE, Saudi Arabia etc., or in Malaysia). Occasionally, residents also travel to Punjab to work as labourers in fields. Many people work in Kathmandu Valley as freelancers. Such work includes fruit selling, work in footpath garment stores, cutting hair (especially by the people belonging to the "Hajam caste").

Infrastructures

Education

Transportation

Communication

Ongoing projects

References
https://web.archive.org/web/20130731000000/http://cbs.gov.np/wp-content/uploads/2012/11/VDC_Municipality.pdf

Populated places in Rautahat District